Thusnelda (minor planet designation: 219 Thusnelda) is a typical S-type Main belt asteroid. It was discovered by Johann Palisa on September 30, 1880, in Pola and was named after Thusnelda, wife of Germanic warrior Arminius.

In 1982, the asteroid was observed using photometry from the La Silla Observatory to generate a composite light curve. The resulting data showed a rotation period of 1.24 days (29.8 h) with a brightness variation of 0.2 in magnitude.

References

External links 
 The Asteroid Orbital Elements Database
 Minor Planet Discovery Circumstances
 Asteroid Lightcurve Data File
 
 

Background asteroids
Thusnelda
Thusnelda
S-type asteroids (Tholen)
18800930